Zacharie is both a masculine French given name and a surname. Notable people with the name include:

Given name
Zacharie Allemand (1762–1828), French admiral
Zacharie Astruc (1833–1907), French sculptor, painter, poet, and art critic
Zacharie Boucher (born 1992), French footballer
Zacharie Cloutier (c. 1590 – 1677), French carpenter and colonist
Zacharie Dupuy (died 1676 or 1610–1676), French soldier
Zacharie Elenga, Congolese musician
Zacharie Gahutu (born 1950), Burundian diplomat
Zacharie Heince (1611–1669), French painter and engraver
Zacharie Jacob (died 1667), French actor and playwright
Zacharie Myboto (born 1938), Gabonese politician
Zacharie Noah (1937–2017), Cameroonian footballer
Zacharie Noterman (1820–1890), Belgian painter and printmaker
Zacharie Perevet (born 1957), Cameroonian politician

Surname
Nicolaus Zacharie (died 1466), Italian Renaissance composer
, Canadian actress

Fictional characters
Zacharie, a character from the role-playing video game "Off"

See also
Saint-Zacharie, a French commune
Zachary

French masculine given names